The UNTV Cup is a men's charity basketball league organized in the Philippines. Twelve basketball teams organized by government agencies and guested by celebrities and ex-pro and amateur players compete in the league.
 
The league's first game started on July 29, 2013 coinciding the 9th Anniversary Celebration of UNTV. As an amateur league, UNTV Cup is using the FIBA rules as its House Rules which is being used in world basketball and Olympics according to Mr. Raffy Britanico, officiating head of Samahang Basketbol ng Pilipinas (SBP), a basketball association in the Philippines.

Its first season was held at the Smart-Araneta Coliseum in Quezon City, Philippines. Fortunato Co serves as the commissioner of the basketball league. Following the success of its first season, UNTV Cup season two was opened on February 11, 2014 at the same venue with newly added public service booths of each participating teams/government agencies. An off-season game was opened on August 21, 2014 with the three branches of the Philippine government: Judiciary, Legislative an Executive teams. Also with Media Team (Team ni Kuya) will also play to complete the set of players.

UNTV Cup is an original concept by Daniel Razon  tagged as Mr. Public Service  and materialized by UNTV widely known as public service television station  in the Philippines. He is the chairman and CEO of BMPI-UNTV, the organization behind the UNTV Cup.

Regular games are usually held at the Pasig City Sports Center in Pasig, but starting in Season 9 (2022-23), it will be held in other public venues with a live telecast on the UNTV Public Service channel every Sunday afternoon.

Teams 

The UNTV Cup started in 2013 with 7 teams. The number of teams differ by season since government agencies voluntarily apply. Each season, participating teams are divided into two groups for the elimination round, but it is not publicly revealed how the selection process for groups is performed.

Government agencies are urged to join and will not have to pay a joining fee. Instead, the teams are given free uniforms by the league, and beneficiaries are given the prize whatever round the teams finished.

There have been 23 teams in the history of the league.

Active Teams

Defunct Teams

Timeline

Championships

Regular season 
The Armed Forces of the Philippines Cavaliers have the most UNTV Cup titles, winning 3 championships in the regular season. The second most successful team is the Judiciary Cagers/Magis, who have 2 championships and undefeated in the Finals. The DENR Warriors, PNP Responders and Senate Defenders won 1 title each, with DENR holding the distinction of being the only first-year team to claim the trophy. Malacañang-PSC Patriots/Kamao (now OP-PMS Trailblazers) is the only team that reached the finals but have not yet won a championship.

Teams that competed in the finals

 Current teams that have no UNTV Cup Finals appearances
Department of Agriculture (Agriculture Food Masters)
Government Service Insurance System (GSIS Furies)
National Housing Authority Builders (NHA Builders/Home Masters)
Ombudsman of the Philippines (Ombudsman Graft Busters)
Philippine Health Insurance Corporation (PhilHealth Advocates/Your Partner In Health/Plus/Konsulta)
Social Security System (SSS Kabalikat)

 Defunct teams that had no UNTV Cup Finals appearances
Bureau of Customs (BOC Transformers)
Bureau of Fire Protection (BFP Firefighters)
Commission on Audit (COA Enablers)
Congress-LGU Legislators
Department of Health (DOH Health Achievers)
Department of Justice (DOJ Hunters/Avengers/Justice Boosters)
House of Representatives (HOR Solons)
Local Government Unit (LGU Vanguards)
Metro Manila Development Authority (MMDA Equalizers/Black Wolves)
Philippine Drug Enforcement Agency (PDEA Drug Busters)
Philippine International Trading Corporation (PITC Global Traders)

Off Season 

There have been four off season tournaments in the history of the league. The 2018 PNP Executives team is the only squad that achieved a perfect season, whether regular season or off season.

3x3 (Tatluhan) 

There have been two editions of the 3x3 tournament, and both instances are won by the PITC Global Traders. Games are held as opener for UNTV Cup Finals.

Beneficiaries
From Season 1 to Season 6, including the three off season tournaments, UNTV Cup has given a total of ₱35 million to the beneficiaries of the participating teams.

Seasons and off-seasons

Regular Seasons

Season 1 (2013) 

UNTV Cup started its first season with a ceremonial toss on July 29, 2013 and it was expected to end in January 2014 but it ended early on November 5 of the same year. The project is aimed to promote unity, camaraderie and physical fitness among government officials in the country. Judiciary team was the winner of the season. The prize was given to the Victims of calamities in Central Visayas and war in Southern Philippines.

Season 2 (2014) 

UNTV Cup season two started its ceremonial toss last February 11, 2014 at the Smart Araneta Coliseum, Quezon City with additional three teams to come up with a total of ten teams. Atoy Co and Ed Cordero serve as commissioner and deputy commissioner respectively during the course of UNTV Cup season two. The game ended successfully on July 8, 2014 on the same venue. AFP Cavaliers was the winning team on this season. The prize was given to its charity AFP Educational Benefit System Office (AFPEBSO).

Season 3 (2014–15) 

UNTV Cup Season 3 opened last October, 2014 as previously announced but the said event was opened on November 17, 2014 at SM Mall of Asia Arena. It was ended on April 28, 2015 in its final games at the Smart-Araneta Coliseum in Quezon City, Metro Manila, Philippines. Aside from existing teams, newcomers are Bureau of Fire Protection (BFP Firefighters), Government Service Insurance System (GSIS Furies) and National Housing Authority (NHA Builders) to complete the eleven teams of the UNTV Cup Season 3. Judiciary Magis was the season's winner. The prize was donated to the Supreme Court employees who are sick or injured while on duty.

Season 4 (2015–16) 

A total of 12 teams, including new team Ombudsman Graft Busters were competed in the UNTV Cup Season 4. AFP Cavaliers and PNP Responders were competed in a best-of-three finals series, of which the AFP clinched the championship title of Season 4. AFP Cavaliers was the champion during the season.

Season 5 (2016–17) 

The Season 5 of the UNTV Cup started on August 29, 2016 at the Mall of Asia Arena. There were 13 teams, including defending champions AFP Cavaliers and new team Bureau of Customs Transformers, will compete for a chance to win the championship of the 5th season of the public service-based basketball tournament. PNP Responders was the winning team on this season.

Season 6 (2017–18) 

The Season 6 of the UNTV Cup started on September 12, 2017 at the Smart Araneta Coliseum, Quezon City, and concluded at the same venue on March 12, 2018. Fourteen teams competed for a chance to win the championship of the public service-based basketball tournament. Senate Defenders defeated Malacañan-PSC Kamao on the Finals, 2 games to zero.

Season 7 (2018–19) 

The 2018–2019 season was the 7th season of the UNTV Cup. The opening games was held on September 3, 2018 at the Smart Araneta Coliseum, Quezon City, and are expected to conclude in March 2019.

Season 8 (2019–20) 

The season officially opened on September 9, 2019 at the Mall of Asia Arena in Pasay. During the opening, it was unveiled that the total cash donation was over 50 million pesos to different charity groups since 2013.

Off-Seasons

Off-Season: Clash of the Three (2014) 

UNTV Cup Off Season, officially called as the UNTV Cup off-season games: Clash of Three (spelled TH3EE or th3ee where 3 represents letter R), was a basketball games among the three branches of the Philippine Government namely: the Judiciary, the Legislative, and Executives teams. Non-earning point Media Team (Team ni Kuya) also play the off-season game to complete the set of players. The off-season game was started on August 21, 2014 at Ynares Sports Arena, Pasig, Metro Manila, Philippines and ended its final games on October 14, 2014. Judiciary team was the winner of the season. The prize was given to Children In Conflict with the Law (CICL).

Off-Season: Executive Face Off 2017 

The first edition of Executive Face Off kicked off on May 21, 2017 at the Pasig Sports Complex. Its aim was to give executives of the Philippine government's various branches a time for relaxation, renewing acquaintance and showcasing of talents. AFP Cavaliers was the winning team during this off-season game on its final games on July 10, 2017. The prize was given to the AFP's Educational Benefit System Office which grants scholarship to orphans and children of soldiers killed and wounded in action.

Off-Season: Executive Face Off 2018 

The second year of the Executive Face Off began on May 6, 2018 at the Pasig Sports Complex. Eight teams, including previous off-season champion AFP Cavaliers, will compete in the tournament and give aid to their beneficiaries.

Off-Season: PBA Legends Face-Off 2019 

The PBA Legends Face-Off was the 4th off-season tournament of the league. It is the first off-season games that featured PBA teams (although composed of alumni players), and a follow-up to the successful reunion charity event PBA Legends: Return of the Rivals on February 17, 2019. The month-long tournament officially opened on June 2, 2019 at the Pasig City Sports Complex, with four teams vying for the championship title. The lone beneficiary for this off season is the PBA Legends Foundation, for the benefit of former professional basketball players who are either sick or in need of financial help. ₱2,000,000 total was donated by all four teams.

The finals game was held on July 8, 2019 at the Smart Araneta Coliseum. It was between the undefeated San Miguel Beermen and #2 team Alaska Milkmen. Alaska escaped San Miguel on a close battle, 77–75, to get the championship.

3x3 Tournaments 

On March 11, 2019, the first 3x3 tournament in the history of the league served as opener for the Game 2 of the Season 7 Finals. The four non-finals playoff teams participated in the knockout games. PITC Global Traders were crowned champions by defeating Malacanang-PSC Kamao in the final, taking home ₱20,000 prize.

The second 3x3 edition started on March 1, 2020, dubbed as Tatluhan. All eight non-semifinals teams participate in the pocket tournament, which opened for the Season 8 Finals.

Awards

Notes

References

External links 
 UNTVweb.com

Members Church of God International
 
Basketball leagues in the Philippines
2013 Philippine television series debuts
Charity events in the Philippines
UNTV (Philippines) original programming
Annual events in the Philippines
Recurring events established in 2013
2013 establishments in the Philippines